The Marvin Miller Man of the Year Award is given annually to a Major League Baseball (MLB) player "whose on-field performance and contributions to his community inspire others to higher levels of achievement."  The award was created by the Major League Baseball Players' Association (MLBPA) and was presented to the inaugural winner – Mark McGwire – in 1997 as the "Man of the Year Award".  Three years later, it was renamed in honor of Marvin Miller, the first executive director of the MLBPA.  The award forms part of the Players Choice Awards.

In order to determine the winner, each MLB team nominates one of their players, who is selected by their teammates to appear on the ballot.  An online vote is conducted among baseball fans in order to reduce the number of candidates to six.  MLB players then choose the award winner from among the six finalists.  In addition to the award, recipients have $50,000 donated on their behalf to charities of their choice by the MLB Players Trust.  John Smoltz, Jim Thome, Michael Young, and Curtis Granderson are the only players to win the Marvin Miller Man of the Year Award on multiple occasions.  Five winners – Paul Molitor, Jim Thome, Smoltz, Chipper Jones and Mariano Rivera – are members of the National Baseball Hall of Fame.

Winners of the Marvin Miller Man of the Year Award have undertaken a variety of different causes.  Many winners, including McGwire, Thome, Smoltz, Mike Sweeney, Torii Hunter, Young, Curtis Granderson and Brandon Inge, worked with children in need.  McGwire established a foundation to assist children who were physically or sexually abused, while Inge visited disabled children at the Mott Children's Hospital and donated part of his salary to raise money for a pediatric cancer infusion center.  Other winners devoted their work to aiding individuals who had a specific illness, such as Albert Pujols, whose daughter suffers from Down syndrome, and who devoted the Pujols Family Foundation to helping those with the disease, and Jones, who has been raising money for cystic fibrosis since 1996, after meeting an 11-year-old fan who suffered from the disease and who died several weeks after meeting Jones through the Make-A-Wish Foundation.

Winners

See also

Roberto Clemente Award
Lou Gehrig Memorial Award
Branch Rickey Award
Baseball awards
List of Major League Baseball awards

Notes

References
GeneralSpecific

Major League Baseball trophies and awards
Awards established in 1997